Diana Margaret Napper, who published as D. M. Napper, (23 August 1930, Woking – 31 March 1972, London) was an English botanist, specializing in the systematic botany of East Africa, particularly grasses.

Life
She was educated at the University of Exeter, graduating with a B.Sc. in botany in 1953. In 1954 she started working for the Department of Agriculture in Kenya, starting at the Coffee Research Station in Ruiru. In 1955 she transferred to the East African Herbarium in Nairobi. After returning to England, she was for a short time on the staff of the Kew Herbarium.

She studied the families Acanthaceae, Cyperaceae, and Gramineae of East Africa.

Works
 (with K. W. Harker) An illustrated guide to the grasses of Uganda, 1960
 Grasses of Tanganyika: with keys for identification, 1965

References

1930 births
1972 deaths
English botanists
British expatriates in Kenya